Aaqib Khan (born 25 December 2003) is an Indian cricketer. He made his first-class debut on 11 January 2020, for Uttar Pradesh in the 2019–20 Ranji Trophy. He made his Twenty20 debut on 16 January 2021, for Uttar Pradesh in the 2020–21 Syed Mushtaq Ali Trophy. He made his List A debut on 24 February 2021, for Uttar Pradesh in the 2020–21 Vijay Hazare Trophy.

References

External links
 

2003 births
Living people
Indian cricketers
Uttar Pradesh cricketers
Place of birth missing (living people)